Gram was one of the earliest legendary Danish kings according to Saxo Grammaticus' Gesta Danorum. His history is given in more detail than those of his predecessors. Georges Dumézil argued that Gram was partially modelled on the god Thor, in particular his defeat of Hrungnir and subsequent encounter with Gróa.

The Old Norse word gramr means "king" and is probably the source of Gram's name, possibly through a misunderstanding of Saxo's. No other ancient source mentions a king named Gram.

References
 Dumézil, Georges (1973). From Myth to Fiction : The Saga of Hadingus. Trans. Derek Coltman. Chicago: U. of Chicago Press. .
 Davidson, Hilda Ellis (ed.) and Peter Fisher (tr.) (1999). Saxo Grammaticus : The History of the Danes : Books I-IX. Bury St Edmunds: St Edmundsbury Press. . First published 1979-1980.
 Elton, Oliver (tr.) (1905). The Nine Books of the Danish History of Saxo Grammaticus. New York: Norroena Society. Available online
 Olrik, J. and H. Ræder (1931). Saxo Grammaticus : Gesta Danorum. Available online

Mythological kings of Denmark